Fernanda Motta (born May 29, 1981) is a Brazilian model, actress, and television host.  She is the host of the reality TV show Brazil's Next Top Model, the Brazilian version of the show, created by Tyra Banks.

Biography
Motta was born and grew up in Campos dos Goytacazes, Rio de Janeiro, Brazil. The youngest child of a large extended family, Motta was discovered on Guarapari Beach, just north of Rio de Janeiro at the age of 16 by a talent scout.

Modeling
Motta has appeared on the covers of numerous magazines around the world, including Vogue, ELLE, Cosmopolitan, and Glamour. Her advertisements include Rolex, Palmolive, Cori, Pantene, and Moët & Chandon, and she has walked for Cia Marítima, Gucci, and Chanel. She has appeared in four editions of the Sports Illustrated Swimsuit Issue, most recently in 2007. In 2005, she ranked 19th in the "Top 25 Sexiest Models" list by "Models.com". She is signed to Chic Management in Sydney, Australia, and to Elite Model Management in New York City. She currently lives in New York City.

Brazil's Next Top Model
In 2007, Motta was chosen to be the host of the Brazil's Next Top Model. In order to accept the job, Motta, who lives in New York City, United States, reportedly cancelled most of her agenda so that she could stay in the country for two months straight.

Motta also was a guest judge on the episode "The Amazing Model Race" from America's Next Top Model, Cycle 12, when the final six contestants arrived in São Paulo, Brazil.
She also appeared in a Rosa Chá swimsuit fashion show on the final episode "America's Next Top Model Is...", in the same season.

Filmography

Actress

Self

References

External links

Fernanda Motta in the Top25 at Models.com
Sports Illustrated - Fernanda Motta Swimsuit Collection
Fernanda Motta Next Model Management

1981 births
Living people
Brazilian female models
People from Campos dos Goytacazes
Brazilian television presenters
IMG Models models
Brazilian women television presenters
Brazilian people of Italian descent